The Comoros national football team represents the Comoros in international football and is controlled by the Comoros Football Federation. It was formed in 1979, joined the Confederation of African Football (CAF) in 2003, and became a FIFA member in 2005. Comoros qualified for their first major tournament in 2021, after their 0–0 draw with Togo assured them of a place in the 2021 Africa Cup of Nations.

History
The national football team of the Comoros played their first matches in the 1979 Indian Ocean Island Games. Those were the only games they played until qualification for the 2009 Arab Nations Cup in 2006. Those two matches were their first two matches with full FIFA recognition, and included a 4–2 victory over Djibouti. In 2007, Comoros first entered qualification for the World Cup and the Africa Cup of Nations for the 2010 tournaments, but lost in the preliminary round 2–10 on aggregate to Madagascar.

During the 2018 FIFA World Cup qualifiers in October 2015, Les Coelacantes advanced past the first round for the first time ever by beating Lesotho on away goals after two draws. Since then results have improved steadily, including home wins against Botswana, Mauritius and Malawi in Africa Cup of Nations qualifiers.

On 14 November 2019, Comoros opened their 2021 Africa Cup of Nations qualification campaign with a 0–1 win away to Togo, their first away win in a major qualifier. They would go on to qualify for the final tournament, their first major tournament since joining FIFA.

In the 2021 Africa Cup of Nations, Ahmed Mogni scored a brace for Comoros in their 3–2 group match victory over Ghana in what the BBC described as "one of the biggest shocks in Nations Cup history".

Recent results and fixtures

2022

2023

Coaching history

 Pierre Jacky (1985)
 Ali Mbaé Camara (2006–2007)
 Manuel Amoros (2010)
 Mohamed Chamité (2010–2011)
 Ali Mbaé Camara (2011–2013)
 Amir Abdou (2014–2022)
 Younes Zerdouk (2022–present)

Players

Current squad
The following players were called up for the friendly matches against Tunisia and Burkina Faso on 23 and 27 September 2022.

Caps and goals are correct as of 22 September 2022, after the match against Tunisia.

Recent call-ups
The following players have been called up for the team within the last 12 months and are still available for selection.

Player records

Players in bold are still active with the Comoros.

Competitive record

FIFA World Cup

Olympic Games

Football at the Summer Olympics has been an under-23 tournament since the 1992 edition.

Africa Cup of Nations

African Games

 Prior to the Cairo 1991 campaign, Football at the All-Africa Games was open to full senior national teams.

African Nations Championship

COSAFA Cup

Indian Ocean Island Games

Arab Nations Cup

 The 2009 edition was cancelled during qualification.

Pan Arab Games

Head-to-head record
As of 24 January 2022

References

External links
FFC official website
Comoros at FIFA.com
Bourtney, Barri. Comoros – List of International Matches± at RSSSF.com  (Last updated: January 31, 2008) 

 
African national association football teams